The 2022 EAFF E-1 Football Championship was an association football tournament organized by the East Asian Football Federation. It was the 9th edition of the EAFF E-1 Football Championship, the football championship of East Asia. The finals were originally scheduled to be held in China. However, on 19 April 2022, it was announced that Japan would host the finals. It was the nation's fourth time hosting the tournament.

In this edition, preliminary rounds were not conducted. North Korea withdrew from the competition and the remaining slot of the participating teams for the final round was decided upon the FIFA rankings as of 31 March 2022.

Teams
 (host)

Squads

Table

Matches

Awards

Goalscorers

Broadcasting rights
 – Fuji TV
 – SPOTV

See also
 2022 EAFF E-1 Football Championship (women)
 2023 SAFF Championship
 2023 WAFF Championship
 2023 AFC Asian Cup

References

External links
 EAFF E-1 Football Championship 2022 Final Japan, eaff.com
 Competition schedule (PDF), eaff.com

2022
East Asian Cup
East Asian Cup
International association football competitions hosted by Japan
EAFF